Britain's Got Talent is a British talent reality television series that first aired in 2007. As of 2 June 2019, there have been thirteen completed series. The show has been spun off around the world under the Got Talent franchise. The competition is open to people of all ages who possess a talent. After the initial rounds of auditions, successful contestants are narrowed down by the judges.

In the first series, 24 contestants made it into the three semi-finals, and in subsequent series this has been increased to 40 (45 in series 6-10) contestants across five live shows. The act which receives the most public votes in each semi-final goes through to the final, with the second finalist being decided by the judges from the second and third most popular contestants. In series 6, a "wildcard" element was introduced. This is where judges pick an eliminated act from the semi-finals, and that act is sent through to the final. In series 6, the wildcard act selected was The Mend. In series 7, the wildcard was Steve Hewlett and in series 8,al Jon Clegg. Series 9 featured a second wildcard, voted for by the public from the five acts who lost the judges' vote in the semi-finals. The judges' wildcard was Boyband and the public's wildcard was Jessie-Jane McParland. In series 10, the judges chose Shannon + Peter whilst the public chose Trip Hazard. In series 11, the format returned to series 8. The wildcard was Simon Cowell's golden buzzer Sarah Ikumu. In series 12, B Positive Choir was the wildcard. In series 13, dancing couple Libby and Charlie were the wildcards. In Series 14, there were no wildcards, so there were only 10 acts in the final

In the final, each of the finalists perform again, but this time the result is determined purely from the public vote, with the winner receiving £250,000 (£100,000 in series 1–5, £500,000 in series 6) and the chance to perform their act at the Royal Variety Performance.

Opera singer Paul Potts won the first series of the competition in 2007, street dancer George Sampson won the second series in 2008, dance troupe Diversity won the third series in 2009, gymnast troupe Spelbound won the fourth series in 2010, singer Jai McDowall won the fifth series in 2011, dancing dog act Ashleigh and Pudsey won the sixth series in 2012, shadow theatre group, Attraction won the seventh series in 2013, classical singers Collabro won the eighth series in 2014, and musical canine freestyle act Jules O'Dwyer & Matisse won the ninth series in 2015. Magician Richard Jones won the tenth series in 2016. Pianist Tokio Myers won the eleventh series in 2017. Comedian Lost Voice Guy won the twelfth series in 2018. Korean War Veteran and Singing Chelsea Pensioner Colin Thackery won the thirteenth series in 2019. Pianist, singer and comedian Jon Courtenay won the fourteenth series in 2020.

Contestants
For more details on each of the contestants, see the relevant series article.

References

External links
Official website

Lists of reality show participants